Herman Samuel Fuchs (10 December 1900 – November 1967) was a violinist who provided music for the Frank Buck movie Jungle Cavalcade.

Early years
Herman Fuchs was the son of Harry Fuchs, the proprietor of a laundry, and Gussie Fuchs. Harry and Gussie immigrated from Bessarabia, October 1887. Herman was born at 137 Essex Street, on the Lower East Side of Manhattan, and later lived in Brooklyn (234 Rodney Street), according to his 1922 passport application. Herman Fuchs studied with the conductor Josiah Zuro, worked with Hugo Riesenfeld, and attended Fordham University to understand copyright law.

Career
Fuchs became music editor for Pathé News in 1927. He composed for many films, among them The Golden Age of Comedy (1957) and When Comedy was King (1960). He also composed for television, including five episodes of The Patty Duke Show.

Work with Frank Buck
In 1941, Fuchs, together with Nathaniel Shilkret, composed music for the Frank Buck movie Jungle Cavalcade.

Later life
Fuchs died aged 66 in New York.

References

External links
 

1900 births
1967 deaths
American male violinists
Musicians from New York City
American male conductors (music)
20th-century American conductors (music)
20th-century American violinists
Classical musicians from New York (state)
20th-century American male musicians